Michaël Llodra and Nenad Zimonjić were the defending champions but decided not to participate together.
Llodra was scheduled to play alongside Juan Martín del Potro but withdrew from the first round while Zimonjić partnered up with Robert Lindstedt and successfully defended the title, defeating Thiemo de Bakker and Jesse Huta Galung in the final 5–7, 6–3, [10–8].

Seeds

Draw

Draw

External links
 2006 ABN AMRO World Tennis Tournament Doubles Main draw

ABN AMRO World Tennis Tournament - Doubles
2013 ABN AMRO World Tennis Tournament